Eyelids is a 2015 South Korean drama starring Moon Seok-beom. Written and directed by O Muel, it follows an old man living a monk-like ascetic life on an island. Feeling frustrated and powerless while watching the news coverage in the aftermath of the Sewol ferry disaster on April 16, 2014, O wrote the script in three days to offer a way to console the souls of the dead. It made its world premiere at the 20th Busan International Film Festival in 2015 and won the CGV Arthouse Award and DGK Award.

Plot 
An old man (Moon Seok-beom) living a monk-like ascetic life on an island. A phone rings, followed by a visitor for whom the man prepares the rice cakes, the last meal before the visitor journeys to the next world.

Cast 
Moon Seok-beom as old man
Lee Sang-hee
Sung Min-chul
Lee Ji-hoon
Kang Hee

Awards and nominations

References

External links 
 
 
 

2015 films
2010s Korean-language films
South Korean drama films
Films directed by O Muel
2010s South Korean films